Rebel Yell is a brand of Kentucky straight bourbon whiskey owned and marketed by Luxco.  Rebel Yell is now distilled and aged at Luxco's new distillery, Lux Row Distillers, in Bardstown, Kentucky. The 40% alcohol by volume (80 U.S. proof) spirit was formerly produced under contract by Heaven Hill at its Bernheim distillery in Louisville.

History
The W.L. Weller & Sons company was founded in 1849 by William Larue Weller, who pioneered using wheat instead of rye in his mash for a lighter flavor than the older style of bourbons. The W.L. Weller company merged with the Stitzel distilling company (est. 1872) to form the Stitzel-Weller distilling company in 1910.

The "Rebel Yell" brand was created at Stitzel-Weller in the 1930s (with the idea of distilling it in limited batches for exclusive distribution in the Southern United States). "Charley (Farnsley) concocted it in about 1937, and his uncle (Alexander Thurman Farnsley) owned W. L. Weller, on Main Street, at that time, with the Stitzler-Weller people, and they bottled it for him." Charles R. Farnsley (a former mayor of Louisville) owned the Brand. "He didn't bottle a great deal of it, and several years later, four or five years later he sold the brand to the Southern Comfort people, and they never used it. Years later, Julian Van Winkle came over to him and said, "Charley, are you gonna use the name Rebel Yell?" And Charley said, "Well it wouldn't be proper since I sold it." And he said, "Well if you don't pick it up we're thinking of picking it up." And Charley said, "Well, that's fine." *(Interview with Nancy Farnsley, November 14, 1984)  In the early 1980s, after some other changes of ownership following the break-up of Stitzel-Weller around 1972, the brand was purchased by the David Sherman Corporation of St. Louis, Missouri (now Luxco). By 1984, Rebel Yell was distributed nationally.

See also
 Other wheated bourbon brands produced by the Stitzel-Weller distillery:
W. L. Weller, a brand named after the distiller who is said to have pioneered the use of wheated bourbon recipes
Old Fitzgerald, another bourbon brand, originally produced by another company but purchased by Stitzel-Weller soon after Prohibition and thereafter converted to using a wheated recipe
Pappy Van Winkle's Family Reserve, another wheated bourbon brand, named after a leading figure of the Stitzel-Weller history
Cabin Still bourbon, originally produced in the 1840 by E. G. Booz, later becoming a Stitzel-Weller wheated brand, possibly no longer wheated in its current brand expression
Maker's Mark, a well-known wheated bourbon developed from a recipe influenced by Pappy Van Winkle of Stitzel-Weller

Notes
Tasting notes have been reported as:
"Nose" (scent): Honey, butter, raisins
"Mouth" (taste): A big, round body with a palette that directly follows the nose – honey, butter and just a hint of dark fruit (plums, raisins). The finish is long, warm and interesting in that a touch of spiciness, not present in the palette, comes into play.

Uses in fiction and art
In the novels of Douglas Preston and Lincoln Child, Lieutenant Vincent D'Agosta favors this particular bourbon (e.g. Book of the Dead).
In the extended edition of Stephen King's post-apocalyptic novel The Stand, a maniacal character dubbed "The Kid" has a fanatical taste for Rebel Yell.
Keith Richards of The Rolling Stones was once known to be an avid drinker of Rebel Yell. In fact, Billy Idol has said in his episode of VH1 Storytellers that his hit "Rebel Yell" was inspired upon joining Richards, Mick Jagger and Ron Wood in taking swigs from a bottle of Rebel Yell at a gathering they all attended.  He liked the sound of the brand name, and said he recalled that he actually asked if they (Jagger and Richards) had no objections to his use of the brand name for a future song title.  "I've got it now . . . little did they know."
In Dr. Dog's song "100 Years," the singer makes a reference to Rebel Yell: "When the sun shines down on what's left of me/About a hundred years from now/Gonna cut my water with Rebel Yell/And claw my way back to town."
In one of Norm Macdonald's final Saturday Night Live sketches, he hosted a game show entitled "Who's More Grizzled?" featuring Garth Brooks and Robert Duvall as two old men in a trivia contest to find out who indeed was more grizzled.  The grand prize for the show was salted meats and a bottle of Rebel Yell.
William G. Tapply's fictional Boston attorney Brady Coyne's favorite libation, in more than fifteen mystery novels, was Rebel Yell.
Rebel Yell Bourbon is featured in the lyrics to "Honky Tonk Hell" a song performed by Webb Wilder on his 1995 album Town & Country: "One wife, two on the side; Too many stories I can't tell; Too much loss of memory; Too many bottles of Rebel Yell; One more night in a roadhouse; I figure I might as well; I know when it's all over for me; I'll be headin' down to honky tonk hell."

See also
 Rebel yell

External links
Rebel Yell homepage
Luxco website

References

Bourbon whiskey
Food and drink companies established in 1849
1849 establishments in Kentucky
Products introduced in 1936
Alcoholic drink brands
American brands
Economy of Louisville, Kentucky